Outdoor(s) may refer to:

Wilderness
Natural environment
Outdoor cooking
Outdoor education
Outdoor equipment
Outdoor fitness
Outdoor literature
Outdoor recreation
Outdoor Channel, an American pay television channel focused on the outdoors
Outdoor, an German travel & lifestyle magazine

See also
 
 
Out of Doors (Bartók)
Field (disambiguation)
Outside (disambiguation)
The Great Outdoors (disambiguation)